Mobeen (Arabic: مبين; Persian: موبین) (also Mubeen, Mobin, Mubin) is a given name derived from an Arabic word (مبين), which is used as a poetic adjective in literature, speech and religious contexts. The name can be translated as  'distinct', 'lucid', 'eloquent', 'prominent' or 'clarity'. It is commonly used as a given name in the Middle East, Afghanistan, Pakistan, India and respective diaspora.

Etymology
The definition of Mobeen is "something that is clear and incomparable to anything else".

The name is primarily derived from the Muslim holy book, the Quran, in which it used multiple times as an adjective to describe the Quran.

People with the given name
Mobeen Azhar, British journalist, radio and television presenter
Mobin Mirdoraghi (born 1993), Iranian football defender 
Mobin Rai (born 1993), Indian football defender
Mubeen Gabol (born 1986), Pakistani actor and comedian
Mubeen Hameed (born 1995), Pakistani cricketer
Mubeen Mughal (1992–2016), Pakistani cricketer
Mubeen Saudagar, Indian stand-up comedian and mimicry artist
Mubin Ergashev (born 1973), Tajik professional football former player
Mubin Shaikh, former security intelligence and counter terrorism operative
Mubin Sheppard (1905–1994), Malaysian World War II veteran

People with the surname
Abu Lais Md. Mubin Chowdhury, Bangladesh Nationalist Party politician
Abdul Hakkul Mubin, the thirteenth Sultan of Brunei
Amir Shahreen Mubin (born 1983), Malaysian professional footballer
Kazi Mobin-Uddin (1930–1999), American surgeon
Md Abdul Mubeen (born 1955), Bangladeshi General

Usage in fiction
Man Like Mobeen is a BBC sitcom based on a fictional character called Mobeen from Small Heath, Birmingham, played by BBC Asian Network comedian Guz Khan.

See also
Fath ol Mobin (disambiguation)
Al-Fatah al-Mubin, operations room of Syrian rebel and jihadist factions participating in the Syrian civil war
Mobinnet (Mobin Net), an Iranian Internet service provider
Mobin Trust Consortium, an Iranian company
Nūram Mūbin, Gujarati Nizari Ismaili text

References

Names of God in Islam
Arabic-language names